Shiflet Field  is a public use airport located three nautical miles (6 km) north of the central business district of Marion, a city in McDowell County, North Carolina, United States. It is owned by the Marion Airport Commission.

Facilities and aircraft 
Shiflet Field covers an area of 30 acres (12 ha) at an elevation of 1,212 feet (369 m) above mean sea level. It has one runway designated 10/28 with a turf surface measuring 3,340 by 180 feet (1,018 x 55 m).

For the 12-month period ending August 16, 2012, the airport had 4,350 aircraft operations, an average of 11 per day: 99% general aviation and 1% military.
At that time there were 59 aircraft based at this airport: 93.2% single-engine, 3.4% multi-engine, and 3.4% ultralight.

References

External links 
 Aerial image as of April 1998 from USGS The National Map
 

Airports in North Carolina
Transportation in McDowell County, North Carolina